Susan Jane Richardson (born 26 January 1955) is a female English former competitive swimmer.

Swimming career
Richardson swam for Great Britain in the Olympics and European championships.  She won a bronze medal in the 400-metre individual medley at the 1974 European Aquatics Championships; she finished fourth in the 200-metre medley. She competed in these events at the 1972 and 1976 Summer Olympics, but did not reach the finals.

She represented England in the 200 and 400 metres individual medley events, at the 1974 British Commonwealth Games in Christchurch, New Zealand. At the ASA National British Championships she won the 200 metres medley title in 1972.

References

1955 births
Living people
Swimmers at the 1972 Summer Olympics
Swimmers at the 1976 Summer Olympics
Olympic swimmers of Great Britain
European Aquatics Championships medalists in swimming
Swimmers at the 1974 British Commonwealth Games
Commonwealth Games competitors for England